Nam Du Islands is an archipelago located in the Gulf of Thailand, southeast of Phú Quốc Island. It constitutes An Sơn and Nam Du Commune of Kiên Hải District, Kiên Giang Province, Vietnam.

Geography
The archipelago consists of 21 large and small islands. The largest island is Hòn Lớn (sometimes referred as Nam Du) Island with a peak of 309 m.  Islands have tropical monsoon climate; the rainy season lasts from April to October every year. 

List (nox exhaustive) of Nam Du Islands

See also
 Bà Lụa Islands

References

Archipelagoes of Vietnam
Landforms of Kiên Giang province
Islands of the Gulf of Thailand